The 1500 meters distance for men in the 2012–13 ISU Speed Skating World Cup was contested over six races on six occasions, out of a total of nine World Cup occasions for the season, with the first occasion taking place in Heerenveen, Netherlands, on 16–18 November 2012, and the final occasion also taking place in Heerenveen on 8–10 March 2013.

Zbigniew Bródka of Poland won the cup, while Bart Swings of Belgium came second, and the defending champion, Håvard Bøkko of Norway, came third.

Top three

Race medallists

Standings 
Standings as of 10 March 2013 (end of the season).

References

Men 1500